is a Japanese football player for Thespakusatsu Gunma.

Career
Fujiwara was signed by Thespakusatsu Gunma in 2017, only to be loaned mid-season to Tonan Maebashi. He played five matches. In 2018, he returned to Thespakusatsu and played in one match against Vegalta Sendai in the 2018 Emperor's Cup.

Club statistics
Updated to 22 August 2018.

References

External links 

Profile at J. League
Profile at Thespakusatsu Gunma

1994 births
Living people
Association football people from Osaka Prefecture
Japanese footballers
J2 League players
J3 League players
Thespakusatsu Gunma players
Association football defenders